The Cabinet of South Sudan is the Executive Branch of the Government of South Sudan. The Cabinet members are appointed by the President and report to the President.

Revitalized Transitional Government of National Unity (RTGoNU)

Under the terms of 2018 Revitalized Peace Agreement that came into effect on 22 February 2020, South Sudan is governed by a Revitalized Transitional Government of National Unity (RTGoNU). This government is led by a cabinet of 35 members. Under the terms of the agreement, SPLM will nominate 20 ministers, SPLM-IO will nominate nine ministers, South Sudan Opposition Alliance (SSOA) will nominate 3, former detainees will nominate 2 and the remaining minister will be nominated by other parties to the agreement.

List of ministers
A cabinet made up of 35 ministers and 10 deputy ministers was appointed on 12 March 2020.

Former cabinet

See also

 South Sudan
 Government of South Sudan
 Economy of South Sudan
 Education in South Sudan

References

External links
 Website of Government of South Sudan
 

Government of South Sudan
South Sudan